Riccardo Tesi (born 1956 in Pistoia, Tuscany, Italy) is an Italian musician.  He specializes in folk music.  His instrument is the diatonic accordion or melodeon.  He has founded or recorded with a number of groups, including Banditaliana and Ritmia. Tesi has released several solo albums and has also worked with such musicians as Elena Ledda, Piero Pelu, Ivano Fossati, Ornella Vanoni, Patrick Vaillant and Fabrizio De André, among others.

Discography

As leader
Riccardo Tesi & Patrick Vaillant – Veranda (1991) 
Riccardo Tesi – Il Ballo Della Lepre (1993)
Riccardo Tesi & Patrick Vaillant – Colline (1994) 
Riccardo Tesi – Banditaliana (1999)
Riccardo Tesi – Acqua Foco E Vento (2003)
Riccardo Tesi & Banditaliana – Thapsos (2004)
Riccardo Tesi – Crinali (2006)
Riccardo Tesi – Italie - Accordéon Diatonique (2007)
Riccardo Tesi – Presente Remoto (2008)
Riccardo Tesi & Claudio Carboni – L'Osteria del Fojonco (2009)
Riccardo Tesi – Madreperla (2011)
Riccardo Tesi – Cameristico (2012)
Riccardo Tesi & Banditaliana – Maggio (2014)
Riccardo Tesi & Banditaliana – Argento (2018)

As contributor

References

External links
 The official Riccardo Tesi web site

Italian musicians
Living people
1956 births